Theodore Charles Menze (November 4, 1897 – December 23, 1969) was an outfielder in Major League Baseball. He played for the St. Louis Cardinals in 1918.

References

External links

1897 births
1969 deaths
Major League Baseball outfielders
St. Louis Cardinals players
Baseball players from St. Louis
Rochester Hustlers players
Galveston Pirates players
Houston Buffaloes players
Peoria Tractors players
Kansas City Blues (baseball) players
Oklahoma City Indians players
Wichita Falls Spudders players
Springfield Senators players
Fort Wayne Chiefs players